Cioburciu may refer to:
Cioburciu, a commune in Ștefan Vodă District, Moldova
Cioburciu, a commune in Transnistria

See also
Nistru Cioburciu, a football club
Constructorul Cioburcu, a football club